Alejandro Andrés Tobar Vargas (born 4 June 1976) is a Chilean former professional footballer who played as a forward for clubs in Chile and Asia.

Career
A product of O'Higgins youth system in his hometown, Tobar stayed with the club until 2000 and got promotion to the 1999 Primera División, alongside players such as Mauricio Dinamarca, Roberto González, Iván Sepúlveda, Mario Núñez, among others. In the first half 1997, he played on loan at Palestino.

In Chile, he also played for Deportes Puerto Montt (2001) and Deportes La Serena (2001–02).

Then, he moved to Asia and played mainly in Indonesia. In 2004 he joined Persib Bandung, coinciding with his compatriots Claudio Lizama, Julio Lopez, Angelo Espinosa and the coach Juan Páez. He also played for PSMS Medan (2005–06), Persikab Bandung (2008–2010) and Persikabo Bogor (2013), where he coincided with Julio Lopez again. As a member of PSMS Medan, he won the 2005 Piala Emas Bang Yos (Gold Cup Bang Yos), alongside his compatriots Luis Hicks and Mario Quiñones.

In 2007, he had a stint with the Bruneian club DPMM FC in the Malaysia Super League.

Post-retirement
Tobar has continued on playing football at amateur level in clubs such as Kuda Sakti FC in the Rambo Cup 4294-Kuda Sakti FC I 2021. He also has taken part in exhibition games alongside players such as Cristian Carrasco and Claudio Martínez.

Honours
PSMS Medan
  (Gold Cup Bang Yos):

References

External links
 
 
 

1976 births
Living people
People from Rancagua
Chilean footballers
Chilean expatriate footballers
O'Higgins F.C. footballers
Club Deportivo Palestino footballers
Puerto Montt footballers
Deportes La Serena footballers
Persib Bandung players
PSMS Medan players
DPMM FC players
Persikab Bandung players
Persiku Kudus players
Persikabo Bogor players
Chilean Primera División players
Primera B de Chile players
Indonesian Premier Division players
Malaysia Premier League players
Liga 2 (Indonesia) players
Chilean expatriate sportspeople in Indonesia
Chilean expatriate sportspeople in Malaysia
Chilean expatriate sportspeople in Brunei
Expatriate footballers in Indonesia
Expatriate footballers in Malaysia
Expatriate footballers in Brunei
Association football forwards